Ilex microdonta is a species of flowering plant. It is a tree native to southeastern Brazil, where it is found in high-elevation montane cloud forests of the Atlantic Forest region.

References

microdonta
Endemic flora of Brazil
Flora of the Atlantic Forest